Patriarch Maxim (Maximus) (Marin Naydenov Minkov, October 29, 1914 – November 6, 2012) was the head of the Bulgarian Orthodox Church from 1971 until his death. 

He was born in Oreshak, the second of the two children of Nayden Minkov Rachev and Pena Bordzhukova, but very little is known about his parents' background. He was educated only in his native mountain village of Oreshak but from his late childhood, he became a novice monk in the Troyan Monastery and then studied Orthodox Theology at Sofia University, from which he graduated in 1935 with honours. In 1942 he graduated from the Saint Clement of Ochrid State University of Sofia. He took Holy Orders in 1941 and became secretary general of the Holy Synod in 1955 and titular bishop of Branit on December 30, 1956.

In 1960, he was elected Metropolitan of Lovech on October 30, 1960, and won the election as Patriarch on July 4, 1971, after Patriarch Kyril died.

In the early 1990s, a split in the Bulgarian Church was stimulated by the government of the Union of Democratic Forces, based on the alleged cooperation and affiliation of Maxim with the former regime. However, Maxim was able to take control of the majority of the parishes and to prevent any schismatic threats within the Church. The faction against Maxim formed the Bulgarian Orthodox Church – Alternative synod.

References

1914 births
2012 deaths
People from Troyan
Patriarchs of Bulgaria
Christian Peace Conference members
Sofia University alumni